Caldwell is an unincorporated community located in the town of Waterford, Racine County, Wisconsin, United States. The community was named for settlers Joseph and Tyler Caldwell, two brothers from Vermont who arrived in the area around 1836.

Notes

Unincorporated communities in Racine County, Wisconsin
Unincorporated communities in Wisconsin